Marcos Robson Cipriano (born 27 March 1999), simply known as Marquinhos Cipriano, is a Brazilian professional footballer who plays for club Shakhtar Donetsk, as a left-back.

Club career
A native of Catanduva, Cipriano joined the youth academy of Desportivo Brasil at the age of 14 after an unsuccessful trial with Santos FC. While playing for Desportivo Brasil, he was scouted by Grêmio, Santos, Palmeiras and Corinthians; although he wanted to play for his favourite club São Paulo. In September 2015, he was bought by São Paulo Futebol Clube for $1 million. His contract termination fee was set at $120 million. Soon after joining the club, São Paulo rejected a $7 million offer from Spanish club Atlético Madrid to secure his services. He emerged as the top scorer of the U-17 Campeonato Paulista of 2016 with 21 goals and was subsequently promoted to the under-20 team. On 16 January 2018, Cipriano was called to the senior team for a match against São Bento in the Paulista. He made his debut in the match, coming as a substitute for Júnior Tavares in the 2–0 defeat.

On 10 July 2018, Cipriano moved abroad and joined Ukrainian club Shakhtar Donetsk on a five-year deal. He previously signed a pre-season contract with the club in January 2018.

Personal life
Cipriano has a twin brother named Mateus who is a volleyball player. He also has a sister named Monique.

International career
Cipriano has been capped by Brazil at under-20 level, representing the team at 2017 Toulon Tournament.

Career statistics

Honours

Club
Shakhtar Donetsk

Ukrainian Premier League 
Winner (1): 2018–19

Ukrainian Cup 
Winner (1): 2018–19

References

External links

Marquinhos Cipriano at FC Shakhtar Donetsk website

1999 births
Living people
Association football forwards
Brazilian footballers
Brazilian expatriate footballers
Twin sportspeople
Brazilian twins
People from Catanduva
Brazil youth international footballers
Desportivo Brasil players
São Paulo FC players
FC Shakhtar Donetsk players
FC Sion players
Cruzeiro Esporte Clube players
Ukrainian Premier League players
Swiss Super League players
Brazilian expatriate sportspeople in Switzerland
Brazilian expatriate sportspeople in Ukraine
Expatriate footballers in Switzerland
Expatriate footballers in Ukraine
Footballers from São Paulo (state)